La Minerve, later La Minerve française,  was a daily French newspaper first published on 1 April 1818. Liberal and in favour of the Charte constitutionnelle, it was suspected under the Bourbon Restoration of being the organ of Bonapartists and Republicans. Its main editors were Benjamin Constant, Louis-Antoine Garnier-Pagès, Louis-Antoine Garnier-Pagès, Victor-Joseph Étienne de Jouy, Étienne Aignan, and the singer Béranger, Évariste Dumoulin, Antoine Jay, Pierre Louis de Lacretelle, Pierre-François Tissot.

Notes

References 

Bibliography

External links 
La Minerve online in Gallica, the digital library of the BnF

Bourbon Restoration
Publications established in 1818
Defunct newspapers published in France
1818 establishments in France